The Kerala State Film Award for Best Choreography is an award presented annually at the Kerala State Film Awards of India to the best dance choreographer in Malayalam film industry. It was introduced in 2005 onward. The awards are managed by the Kerala State Chalachitra Academy, an autonomous non-profit institution functioning under the Department of Cultural Affairs, Government of Kerala. The winner receive a certificate, statuette and a cash prize of ₹50,000.

Winners

References

External links
Official website
PRD, Govt. of Kerala: Awardees List

Kerala State Film Awards